The 2008 United States elections were held on November 4. Democratic Senator Barack Obama of Illinois won the presidential election, by defeating his challenger, Senator John McCain, and the Democrats bolstered their majority in both Houses of Congress.

Obama won his party's presidential nomination after defeating Senator Hillary Clinton in the 2008 Democratic primaries. With Republican President George W. Bush term-limited, Senator John McCain of Arizona won the Republican nomination in the 2008 Republican primaries. Obama won the general election with 52.9 percent of the popular vote and 365 of the 538 electoral votes.

Democrats picked up net gains of eight Senate seats and 21 seats in the House of Representatives on the back of Obama's coattail effect. They also won a net gain of one gubernatorial seat. The 2006 elections and 2008 elections represented the first time since 1936 that Democrats or any party made substantial gains in Congress in two consecutive elections. This would be the last election until 2020 in which the Democrats won the Presidency and unified control of Congress.

This was the first presidential election year since 1964 when the Democratic Party won the White House and had coattails in the Senate and House of Representatives. The major theme during the campaign was the American public's general desire of change and reform from both Washington and the policies of President Bush. The economy and other domestic policies were also dominant issues, especially during the last months of the campaign after the onset of the 2008 economic crisis.

Federal races

President

Senator Barack Obama of Illinois was the Democratic nominee, and Senator John McCain of Arizona was the Republican nominee. Incumbent President George W. Bush was ineligible for re-election per the 22nd Amendment, which limits a president to two terms, and incumbent Vice President Dick Cheney declined to run for the office.

The 2008 presidential election was the first since 1952 in which neither an incumbent president nor an incumbent vice president was a candidate.

Senator Obama won the number of electors necessary to be elected president and was inaugurated on January 20, 2009.

United States Senate

The 33 seats in the United States Senate Class 2 were up for election, plus special Senate elections in Mississippi and Wyoming. The resignation of Mississippi Senator Trent Lott, and the death of Wyoming Senator Craig L. Thomas, both Class 1 senators, meant that both of those states' senate seats were up for election. The Democrats gained 8 seats, while the Republicans did not gain a seat.

United States House of Representatives 

All seats in the House were up for election, including seats of the 435 voting representatives from the states and the 6 non-voting delegates from the District of Columbia and five U.S. territories. This marked the first time that the commonwealth of the Northern Mariana Islands selected a delegate to Congress.

Democrats won the nationwide popular vote for the House of Representatives by 7.2 percentage points, gaining 21 seats. They increased their total number of seats to 257, the largest number of seats held by either party in the House since Democrats lost control of Congress in the 1994 elections.

State races

Governors

Eleven of the fifty United States governors were up for re-election, as were the governorships of two U.S. territories. Eight incumbent state governors were running for re-election, while the retirements of Ruth Ann Minner of Delaware, Matt Blunt of Missouri, and Mike Easley of North Carolina left those gubernatorial positions open. The incumbent governors of Puerto Rico, Aníbal Acevedo Vilá, and American Samoa, Togiola Tulafono, were also up for re-election.

The only governorship that changed party hands was in Missouri: Democrat Jay Nixon was elected to replace Blunt, who chose to retire instead of seeking a second term.

State legislatures

Initiatives and referendums

 State constitutional amendments prohibiting same-sex marriage are passed in three states: Arizona, California, and Florida. The measures in Arizona and California ban same-sex marriage only, while Florida bans both same-sex marriage and civil unions. California is the first state to ban same-sex marriage after having legalized it previously.

References

Further reading
 Barreto, Matt A., et al. ""Should They Dance with the One Who Brung'Em?" Latinos and the 2008 Presidential Election." PS: Political Science & Politics (2009) 41#4 pp: 753-760. online
 Bligh, Michelle C., and Jeffrey C. Kohles. "The enduring allure of charisma: How Barack Obama won the historic 2008 presidential election." The Leadership Quarterly (2009) 20#3 pp: 483–492. online
 Campbell, James E. "An exceptional election: Performance, values, and crisis in the 2008 presidential election." The Forum (2009)  Vol. 6. No. 4. online
 Crotty, William J. Winning the presidency 2008 (Routledge, 2015).
 Jacobson, Gary C. "The 2008 Presidential and Congressional Elections: Anti‐Bush Referendum and Prospects for the Democratic Majority." Political Science Quarterly (2009) 124#1 pp: 1-30. online
 Panagopoulos, Costas, ed. Strategy, Money and Technology in the 2008 Presidential Election (Routledge, 2014).

External links

 United States Election 2008 Web Archive from the U.S. Library of Congress

 
2008